Lac qui Parle is a reservoir located in western Minnesota, United States, which was formed by the damming of the Minnesota River. The dam was built by the Works Progress Administration (WPA) in 1939. It was reconstructed in 1996.  Lac qui Parle is a French translation of the native Dakota name, meaning "lake which speaks".

The northernmost point of the lake is about 3 miles southeast of the city of Appleton.  The lake flows 10 miles southeast to the dam, which is about 4 miles to the west of the town of Watson.

Lac qui Parle State Park is located on the southern portion of the lake. Lac qui Parle serves as a temporary home of thousands of migratory Canada geese and other waterfowl.

References

External links
Lac Qui Parle State Park. Minnesota DNR.

Lakes of Chippewa County, Minnesota
Lakes of Lac qui Parle County, Minnesota
Lakes of Swift County, Minnesota
Reservoirs in Minnesota
Minnesota River
Works Progress Administration in Minnesota